Daniel Campedelli Bueno (born March 25, 1977 in Porto Alegre) is a Brazilian fashion model, reality television personality and occasional actor, best known for being the winner of the third season of Brazilian version of The Farm.

Career
Bueno started traveling and working as a model in 2000. He paraded in editions of Rio Fashion Week and of São Paulo Fashion Week until 2004, the year he moved to New York shortly after signing with Ford Models.

In 2002, Bueno started an international modeling career in Italy via Ford Models Brasil, where he paraded to Calvin Klein and Guess?, recorded a commercial for cosmetics company L'Oréal and paraded to Ermenegildo Zegna at Milan Fashion Week.

In addition, paraded to Armani at Milan Fashion Week and also appeared in advertising campaigns for several brands, including for Banana Republic.

A Fazenda
On September 28, 2010, Daniel Bueno was officially announced as one of the fifteen celebrities contestants on the third season of A Fazenda, the Brazilian version of reality series The Farm, which aired on Rede Record.

On December 21, 2010, after 85 days, he was crowned the winner of the season, beating actor Sérgio Abreu and model Lisi Benitez in the final vote, taking home the R$2 million prize.

Personal life
Bueno is the father of three children, Marina and Angelina with his wife Adriana Schrank (a dentist), and Luke, from his first wedding.

References

External links
Daniel Bueno on Ford Models Brasil
Daniel Bueno on Super Agency
Daniel Bueno on 40º Graus Models 
Daniel Bueno on L'equip Model
Daniel Bueno on Next Management
Daniel Bueno on MGM Models

1977 births
Living people
People from Rio Grande do Sul
Brazilian male models
Reality show winners
The Farm (TV series) winners

pt:A Fazenda 3